Heuchera micrantha is a species of flowering plant in the saxifrage family known by the common name crevice alumroot, or small-flowered alumroot.

Distribution
It is native to western North America from British Columbia to California, where it grows on rocky slopes and cliffs.

Description

This plant is quite variable in appearance. There are a number of wild and cultivated varieties. The leaves are lobed and usually coated in glandular hairs. They are green to reddish-green or purple-green in color and may have very long, gland-dotted petioles. The plant produces an erect inflorescence up to a meter high bearing many clusters of pink, white, or greenish flowers. Each rounded flower has fleshy, hairy lobes tipped with tiny petals and protruding stamens and stigma.

Native Americans pounded the root to make a poultice.

References

External links

Jepson Manual Treatment
Photo gallery

micrantha
Flora of British Columbia
Flora of Washington (state)
Flora of Oregon
Flora of California
Garden plants of North America
Flora without expected TNC conservation status